Willy Breinholst (27 June 1918 – 19 September 2009) was a Danish author, screenwriter, and humorist born in Fredensborg, Denmark.

Filmography
 Summer and Sinners (1960)
 Elsk... din næste! (1967)
 Mig og min lillebror og storsmuglerne (1968)
 Mig og min lillebror og Bølle (1969)

References

External links

1918 births
2009 deaths
People from Fredensborg Municipality
Danish male screenwriters
20th-century screenwriters